California's 10th congressional district special election, 2009 was held on November 3, 2009, to fill the vacancy caused in California's 10th congressional district by the resignation of Ellen Tauscher. Democratic Party candidate John Garamendi won against Republican opponent David Harmer.

Background and procedures for election 
On May 5, 2009, President Barack Obama nominated Democratic Representative Ellen Tauscher for the position of Undersecretary of State for Arms Control and International Security. She was confirmed by the United States Senate on June 26 and subsequently resigned from her congressional seat.

Following her resignation, Governor Arnold Schwarzenegger called a special election. An open primary among candidates of all political parties took place on September 1, 2009. If a candidates received a majority of the vote in the primary, that candidate would wins the seat without an additional election. As that didn't occur, the general election took place on November 3, 2009 between the candidates with the most votes for each party.

Candidates 
The following individuals appeared in the certified list of candidates and the certified list of write-in candidates published by the Secretary of State of California, and were thus eligible to receive votes in the special primary election.

American Independent 
Jerome "Jerry" Denham, an insurance agent

Democratic 
Tiffany René Estrella Attwood, a write-in candidate
Joan Buchanan, the State Assemblymember from the 15th district 
Mark DeSaulnier, the State Senator from the 7th district who was endorsed by Tauscher as her successor
John Garamendi, the Lieutenant Governor
Adriel Hampton, a Government 2.0 blogger and investigator for the San Francisco City Attorney
Anthony Woods, an Iraq War Veteran and economic policy analyst

Green 
Jeremy Cloward, a community college instructor

Peace and Freedom
Mary C. McIlroy

Republican 
Chris Bunch, a small business owner
Gary W. Clift, a retired police officer
David Harmer, an independent businessman
 Mark Loos, a small business owner
David Peterson, an accountability system owner
John Toth, a physician

Polling

General election

Results

Primary 
Since no candidate won a majority in the September 1, 2009, open primary, the candidates with the top votes for each party advanced to the special general election. Garamendi won more votes than any other Democrat and Harmer more than any Republican. Denham, Cloward, and McIlroy were the only candidates from their parties so they advanced the general election by default.

General

References

California 2009 10
California 2009 10
2009 10 Special
California 10 Special
United States House of Representatives 10 Special
United States House of Representatives 2009 10